Markku Uusipaavalniemi (born 23 November 1966 in Karkkila) is a Finnish curler and former politician.

Curling career
Uusipaavalniemi was the skip of Team Finland for the first time in the mid-1990s. Most (but not all) of Finland's curling medals have been achieved with Uusipaavalniemi as skip. Uusipaavalniemi's team won the European championship in 2000. He is also a two-time World Curling Championships bronze medalist (1998 and 2000) and two-time European Curling Championships bronze medalist (1999 and 2001).

Uusipaavalniemi's Finland team disappointingly finished fifth at the 2002 Olympic tournament.

In 2004, he and his somewhat altered Finland line-up pulled off the daunting task of securing qualification for the 2005 Ford World Men's Curling Championships from the 'B' competition at the European championships, where they languished following the country's relegation the previous season.  To do this, they had to win the competition outright, and then overcome Russia in an additional play-off match.
 
At the 2005 World Championship, Uusipaavalniemi's team finished the round-robin tied for first place with five other teams on an 8–3 record. In the tie-breakers however, they were knocked out of contention by Canada's Randy Ferbey. Also in 2005, Uusipaavalniemi won the first ever European Mixed Curling Championship with teammates Kirsi Nykänen, Teemu Salo and Tiina Kautonen in Andorra.

Uusipaavalniemi's Finland team finished the round-robin at the 2006 Olympic tournament in first place, with a 7–2 record. They beat Great Britain 4–3 in the semi-final, with the last stone of the final end — thrown by Uusipaavalniemi — giving the Finns the deciding point. Finland lost the final to Canada 10-4 taking the silver medal.

Two weeks before the start of the 2006 World Men's Curling Championship in Lowell, Massachusetts, Uusipaavalniemi suffered a wrist injury that forced him to miss the team's first three games of the competition. He recovered enough to start playing in the fourth game, where he skipped and threw second rocks. He played out the rest of the competition throwing third rocks, but Finland did not make the playoff round, finishing tied for fifth with a 6–5 record.

Uusipaavalniemi returned to the 2007 Ford World Men's Curling Championship but his team got off to a rough start, losing their first two games and stringing together back-to-back wins only twice. Finland qualified for a tiebreaker with a 6–5 record, but lost to Germany 8-5 and finished sixth. Markku admitted that his recent campaign for (and eventual election to) Finnish parliament had forced him to cut back on curling practice time, perhaps contributing to the team's early struggles.

After the 2007 World Championships Uusipaavalniemi didn't play at a competitive level until he returned to curling in the 2009–10 season with a new team. The new team won the Finnish Championship in the 2010–11 curling season and represented Finland in 2011 European Curling Championships. The appearance in the 2011 Europeans was a disappointment when Finland finished 7th in the B-group.

Political career
On 20 September 2006 Uusipaavalniemi announced his candidacy for Finnish parliament in the 2007 election for the Centre Party.. Uusipaavalniemi was elected along with three other members of his party from the Uusimaa constituency.
He voted against the further privatization of government owned companies as well as against the Lisbon treaty, both of which were supported by the party.

On 11 November 2010 Uusipaavalniemi defected from the Centre Party and joined the ranks of the True Finns Party. He was not reelected in the 2011 election.

Personal life
Uusipaavalniemi lives in Helsinki. He is divorced and has three children. His older brother Jussi taught him how to curl.

Awards
 Colin Campbell Award: 1998, 2003
 Markku of the Year, 2002. The award is given by an association of people named Markku.

References

External links

 Profile on Finnish Curling Association's statistics
 Oulunkylä Curling Hall
 Uusipaavalniemi's candidate for Finnish Parliament campaign site
 MP Defects, Conservatives Take Top Spot

1966 births
Living people
People from Karkkila
Centre Party (Finland) politicians
Finns Party politicians
Members of the Parliament of Finland (2007–11)
Finnish male curlers
Olympic curlers of Finland
Curlers at the 2002 Winter Olympics
Curlers at the 2006 Winter Olympics
Olympic silver medalists for Finland
Olympic medalists in curling
Medalists at the 2006 Winter Olympics
Continental Cup of Curling participants
European curling champions